Start Stadium is a sports venue in Nizhny Novgorod. It is the home of Start.

References

Bandy venues in Russia
Sport in Nizhny Novgorod